Veselovka TV Mast ( Russian: РТПЦ Веселовка) is a  tall guyed tubular steel mast for FM- and TV-transmission near Veselovka in Kaliningrad Oblast at Russia. Veselovka TV Mast was built in 1965 and is from the somewhat unusual structural type 30107 KM. It is equipped with six crossbars equipped with gangways, which run in two levels from the mast structure to the guys.

Radiated Programs

OIRT-Band

Standard-FM

TV

External links 
 http://www.victorcity.dxing.ru/Cities/chernyahovsk.htm 
 Picture

Towers completed in 1965
Radio masts and towers in Europe
Communication towers in Russia